Gwen O'Mahony (born November 2, 1972) is a Canadian politician, who represented Chilliwack-Hope in the Legislative Assembly of British Columbia from April 2012 until April 2013 as a member of the British Columbia New Democratic Party.

She was the first New Democratic Party candidate and the first woman to win the riding of Chilliwack-Hope. Before getting elected as an MLA, she worked for 18 years with the developmentally disabled at a group home. In an interview, she expressed her shock at being elected. "I'm a regular person, I know what it is like when prices go up, because I've lived paycheque to paycheque.", she said.

Gwen is the oldest of seven children and has family members that have battled addiction across generations. Overnight, she had to take over the guardianship of two of her nieces and became their single parent as her sister was unable to care for them. She had to set aside her education and cut back on her work hours. "Going to the courts to get guardianship, that was what sparked my desire to become politically active. I knew I would survive this with the girls, and we are going to have a life. But I saw vulnerable people falling through the cracks." she said.

Putting in shifts at the group home while struggling to find affordable childcare is what led her to the New Democratic Party. When she spoke to a group of New Democrats to explain how government cuts to child-care funding affected the general population, they encouraged her to stand as a candidate. As the sole breadwinner for her family, it was a difficult decision to make since it would mean giving up her steady wage to campaign. It meant burning up her holiday time and taking unpaid leaves all with no guarantee of a payoff. "It was a great gamble." she said.

Her first campaign, in the 2009 election, had limited budget as the NDP preferred not to invest heavily in a riding they had no expectation of winning. Which meant it was mostly her and her campaign manager. They lost the election to the B.C. Liberal incumbent, Barry Penner. With Mr. Penner's resignation in January 2012, the equation changed. Low on the polls due to its move adopting the HST, and the B.C. Conservatives were eating into the Liberals' vote base. This gave the NDP the opportunity to replace Mr. Penner. Ms. O'Mahony put up a fight and won the party nomination. Top party officials sent in veteran organizers. A large campaign office was set up and over 200 campaign staff worked the phones and distributed signs and leaflets. On April 19, she won the difficult by-election which meant packed campaign party where she was toasted with champagne and was asked to get ready for media interviews starting at 6 a.m. the following day.

O'Mahony was previously the party's candidate in Chilliwack-Hope in the 2009 provincial election, as well as running federally for the New Democrats in Chilliwack—Fraser Canyon in the 2011 federal election. In the 2013 provincial election, O'Mahony was defeated by BC Liberal Party candidate Laurie Throness, the same Liberal candidate she had faced in the 2012 by-election. In 2021, O'Mahony unsuccessfully sought the federal NDP nomination for Nanaimo—Ladysmith.

Electoral record

References

External links
Gwen O'Mahony
Gwen O'Mahony

British Columbia New Democratic Party MLAs
People from Campbell River, British Columbia
People from Chilliwack
Women MLAs in British Columbia
Living people
New Democratic Party candidates for the Canadian House of Commons
21st-century Canadian politicians
21st-century Canadian women politicians
1972 births
University of the Fraser Valley alumni